Thomas Soo Yee-Po JP ( born 2 March 1941) was the first Bishop of the Diocese of Western Kowloon in the Hong Kong Anglican Church and was succeeded by Andrew Chan in 2012. He was consecrated a bishop on 30 November 1995 at St John's Cathedral (Hong Kong); and served as an area bishop for Kowloon West & New Territories West (in the Diocese of Hong Kong and Macao) in anticipation of the diocese's split, at which point he became a diocesan bishop. He was the chairman of the Hong Kong Christian Council until 2010.

In 2007, he led a nine-person delegation from Hong Kong to visit Ecumenical Patriarch Bartholomew I of Constantinople to discuss unity between churches.

In 2009, Soo gave a speech regarding religion harmony and peace in mainland China.

Soo is now the Honorary Chaplain in All Saints' Cathedral, Diocese of Western Kowloon.

See also

 Diocese of Western Kowloon

References

1941 births
Living people
Hong Kong Anglicans
Anglican bishops of Western Kowloon